Nileena Abraham (née Dutta) (born 27 July 1925) is a writer and translator from Kerala, India. She was born in Pabna. After earning master's degrees in Bengali language, political science and history, she moved to Kerala and worked as a professor of Bengali at Maharaja's College, Ernakulam and as the Dr. Suniti Kumar Chatterji Professor of Bengali at International School of Dravidian Linguistics, Thiruvananthapuram.

Career
She has translated more than eight Bengali works into Malayalam and ten Malayalam works into Bengali. She was awarded the Sahitya Akademi Translation Prize in 1989 for Bengali translation of Pathummayude Adu and Balyakalasakhi, a collection of Malayalam short stories by Vaikom Muhammad Basheer. She lives in Ernakulam and is married to Abraham Tharyan.

Partial bibliography

Translations into Malayalam
 Arogyaniketanm
 Ezhu Chuvadu
 Irumpazhikal(In 2 parts)
 Midhunalagnam
 Avan Varunnu

References

Malayalam-language writers
20th-century Indian translators
1925 births
Recipients of the Sahitya Akademi Award in Malayalam
Living people
Academic staff of Maharaja's College, Ernakulam
Writers from Kochi
20th-century Indian women writers
Women writers from Kerala
Indian women translators
Recipients of the Sahitya Akademi Prize for Translation